Herbert Campbell (15 March 1889 – 11 March 1974) was a Jamaican cricketer. He played in three first-class matches for the Jamaican cricket team from 1925 to 1927.

See also
 List of Jamaican representative cricketers

References

External links
 

1889 births
1974 deaths
Jamaican cricketers
Jamaica cricketers
Cricketers from Kingston, Jamaica